The winter of 2010–11 was a weather event that brought heavy snowfalls, record low temperatures, travel chaos and school disruption to the islands of Great Britain and Ireland. It was also the second coldest December in the narrower Central England Temperature (CET) record series which began in 1659, falling 0.1 °C short of the all-time record set in 1890. Although there are no xx, December 2010 is thought to be colder than December 1890 over the United Kingdom as a whole, as Scotland was up to 2 °C warmer than England. Hence, it is thought to be the coldest December across Great Britain since before 1659.

The winter of 2010 in England saw the earliest widespread winter snowfall since 1993 with snow falling as early as 24 November across Northumberland and North Yorkshire. In this event Scotland and Northern England were most severely affected. On 9 December temperatures recovered across much of the UK, causing a partial thaw.

Later, on Thursday 16 December a cold front reintroduced a cold, arctic airstream. This cold spell brought further snow and ice chaos back to Ireland and Britain with Southern England, Wales, the Republic of Ireland (excluding the westerly coastal regions) and Northern Ireland bearing the brunt of the wintry conditions. This led to severe disruption to the road and rail network with several airports being closed including London Heathrow Airport for a time. Several local temperature records were broken including a new record low for Northern Ireland of  recorded at Castlederg on 23 December 2010.

By the new year a thaw had begun, and there was no recurrence of the extreme conditions for the remainder of the winter. There was some snowfall in early January, and there was an anticyclonic spell at the end of the month that brought some cold, frosty days. February was above average in temperature and ended on a mild note, although the snow returned in much of Scotland during March.

Background

During the latter part of November, northern blocking established over Greenland which resulted in the jet stream moving south, allowing cold air to flow in from the east. Forecasters warned of the potential for severe winter weather from weeks in advance and the Government stated that they were prepared for winter weather after the previous British winter of 2009–2010 caused widespread disruption. The cold weather arrived in Britain and Ireland on 22 November and by 24 November, snow showers brought by a stiff northerly wind fell over the North East of England and Northern and Eastern Scotland which resulted in  locally and gridlock in many of the major roads within Aberdeen during the evening rush hour of 24 November.

In the following days, the snow fell far more widely leading to widespread travel disruption, school closures and cancellation of sporting fixtures. The Met Office confirmed that it was the most widespread snowfall in the United Kingdom for 17 years. Snow depths elsewhere were between  widely. Temperatures fell widely below  with some areas staying sub-zero by day.

Reported effects

Deaths

On 30 November in Newport, South Wales a man was found dead in the street—it was assumed that he froze to death after collapsing with a heart attack.
Two old-age pensioners were found in the snow in their gardens dead from hypothermia at the beginning of December.
On 2 December two teenage girls died in a car crash caused by ice on the A595 in Cumbria.
On 6 December a 70-year-old man was found dead in the snow in a caravan park in Cleethorpes, and a man died trying to clear snow outside his home in Darlington, County Durham.
There were several deaths on 18 December: a 17-year-old boy from Bilsington, Kent, was killed when his car left the road; two pedestrians died after being hit by a Range Rover in Glasgow; a woman in her 60s from the Inverness area, was killed in a three-vehicle pile-up in Huntly, Aberdeenshire; and a man in his early 30s suffered life-threatening injuries when his Mini was in a crash with a highways vehicle near Eastbourne, East Sussex, and died after an ambulance being driven by a police officer left a country road in poor weather conditions and careered into a bush on Standard Hill, in Ninfield.
On 19 December there were several more deaths. A 33-year-old man died after falling through the ice on Doggetts Lake in Rochford, Essex; a road crash killed 16-year-old James Doran and Jordan Kenny when the car they were travelling in lost control on an icy road in Liverpool and ploughed into a garden wall; a 15-year-old girl died in a sledding accident in Douglas, County Cork, Ireland; and a 35-year-old woman and her 9-year-old son were killed in a car crash caused by ice and snow near Castlebellingham in County Louth, Ireland.
On 22 December, a 48-year-old man died from hypothermia, after sleeping overnight in the Bible Gardens, behind the cathedral in Bangor, North Wales.

Economy
The severe cold spell came in the run up to Christmas and was estimated to cost the British economy up to £1.2 billion a day with a total cost of £13 billion. Retailers were particularly badly hit by lost sales with footfall down nearly 20% compared to the same period the previous year and as much as 30% in the West Midlands and South East. Some experts suggested that it may have a knock on effect in delaying or reversing economic growth. Christmas is usually the most profitable period for the pub and restaurant industry, however, due to disruptions to delivery routes, numerous stock outs and disappointing trading updates were reported.

Transport

Road
On 1 December the M1 motorway was temporarily closed, and the Forth Road Bridge was closed for over ten hours due to heavy snowfall. This was the first time the bridge had been closed because of snow. The same day, the A57 was closed in the evening between Anston and Worksop and over 100 motorists were stranded overnight. On 6 December, vehicles were trapped on the M8 for over 10 hours, and more than 1,000 vehicles became stuck on the M876.

Rail
At the same time. services were cancelled on the East Coast Main Line between London and Peterborough due to damage to overhead power cables caused by accretion of ice.

Air
At Newcastle Airport, a plane overshot its target stop position on the runway, but remaining on the hard surface. This caused the airport to be temporarily closed. No passengers were injured. Gatwick Airport and Edinburgh Airport were closed all day on 1 December due to heavy snow.

Other effects
7,000 schools in the UK were closed on 2 December.

Timeline

November 2010
In late November, a snow storm had moved from southern Sweden, reaching Northumberland and the Scottish Borders Region during 23 November. The Met Office issued a number of weather warnings, and snow began to fall in the early evening of 24 November, with  recorded in Newcastle upon Tyne.

The cold snap heralded the earliest winter snow fall for 17 years. The AA dealt with an estimated 15,500 calls regarding breakdowns on the same day. The night of the 26/27 November saw a thunder storm damage electrical systems and flood roads, causing disruption transport services on 27 November, including to trains in Dublin. Elsewhere in Ireland, the Irish Insurance Federation revealed there were 22,450 claims from the public, the majority of which involved snow or ice damage to people's homes. The DART and the northern commuter and Maynooth commuter lines were not running and Belfast and Rosslare train services out of Dublin were also affected. The main runway at Dublin Airport due to snow and ice for most of the day.

Later in November, the Met Office's warnings remained in place across much of the UK, with Scotland and North East England predicted to have the heaviest snowfalls, with new warnings in place for icy roads in Northern Ireland and Wales. Snow was causing problems on some roads, with gritters deployed as temperatures dipped to -3 °C (27 °F). The AA reportedly faced a 40% increase in call-outs, compared to an average November. Motorists in Wales and Northern Ireland struggled with icy roads while Scotland was facing more heavy snow and drifts thanks to a biting wind.

The lowest temperature of the month was also recorded on this day, with  recorded at Llysdinam, Wales.

December 2010

According to the Manley Central England Temperature record (beginning in 1659), the second-coldest December ever recorded in central England. Also the coldest December in the UK since UK records began in 1890, and the coldest December in Ireland since official records began.

A band of snow moving north affected Lincolnshire, Nottinghamshire, South and West Yorkshire, giving significant accumulations here, with further frequent heavy snow showers to North East England and Eastern Scotland.

By 6 December, snowfall in the Central Belt in Scotland led to the closure of the M8 motorway for two days with hundreds of motorists stranded overnight. The resulting political furore led to the resignation of Scottish Minister for Transport, Stewart Stevenson.

By mid-December, a cold front reached the Shetland Isles and moved southwards across Scotland. Mild air preceded the front, with cold air straight from the Arctic following it, resulting in some rapid temperature drops throughout Scotland and its Isles. The cold front continued to move southwards across the UK passing Northern Ireland and Northern England.

Later in December, the M5 became gridlocked, and shops in the Birmingham area closed early on the last Saturday before Christmas. A number of passengers travelling by coach had to spend the night at Birmingham Coach Station due to not only coaches for onwards destinations being unable to depart and arrive Birmingham, but also widespread disruption to train services making onwards alternatives impossible. Airports including Heathrow Airport closed some its runways for a time, with Gatwick also cancelling a number of flights.

Heavy snow fall was also reported over large parts of Devon causing major travel disruption. Dublin Airport and City of Derry Airport were forced to fully close, 15 cm (6 inches) of snow was recorded at Dublin Airport.

On 24 December, it was decided to cancel the 27th IRFU's Celtic League meeting with Leinster as Ulster's Ravenhill pitch froze under heavy snow. Both northern and southern Ireland were under heavy snow.

At the end of December, thousands of homes and businesses in Northern Ireland and Wales were without water as melting snow and ice revealed many burst pipes. Northern Ireland Water said it was alternating supplies from reservoirs in order to help alleviate the crisis in which some properties had been without supplies since before Christmas.

January 2011
In contrast to December, it was dry across most of the country (except South East England which was wetter than average). It had more frost than average across most of the UK. However, freezing rain caused disruption in Shropshire, and Greater Manchester experienced heavy overnight snow which affected travel on the morning of the 4th. and snow fell in the West Midlands and parts of Wales, Cheshire and Lancashire on 7 January.

Welsh flood warnings stay in place in four areas, with roads closed after heavy bursts of rain affecting Conwy and Gwynedd. By 15.55 GMT, there were four flood warnings and six flood alerts 16 January 2011.

February 2011
February was a mild month (the 9th mildest in the last century) with very little frost and much of the country having its first snow-free February since 1998. The only significant wintry weather came on the 18th-21st when some overnight dustings of snow fell as far south as the Midlands.

March 2011
Heavy snow once again started to cover parts of Scotland, affecting travel from 9 March, with fresh snowfalls bringing more travel disruption on 12 March.

Weather statistics and records

Probably the most notable record of the winter is the new all-time record low for Northern Ireland, of  recorded on 23 December at Castlederg, County Tyrone. In addition, all of these sites recorded their all-time record lows since recording began, this winter:

See also
January 2013 Great Britain and Ireland snowfall 
Cyclone Carmen
Winter of 2010–2011 in Europe
2010 Albania floods
2010 West African floods
2010 Central European floods
2010 Var floods
2010 Northern Hemisphere summer heat wave
Arctic dipole anomaly
Arctic oscillation
Cyclogenesis
Flood control in the Netherlands
Gulf Stream
Muddy flood
Winter storm
Xynthia (storm)

References

2010 cold waves
2011 cold waves
2010 in Ireland
2011 in Ireland
2010 disasters in the United Kingdom
2011 disasters in the United Kingdom
Cold waves in Ireland
Cold waves in the United Kingdom
Winter weather events in Ireland
Winter weather events in the United Kingdom
2010 disasters in Ireland
2011 disasters in Ireland